Pretzel Logic is the third studio album by American rock band Steely Dan, released on February 20, 1974, by ABC Records. It was written by principal band members Walter Becker and Donald Fagen, and recorded at The Village Recorder in West Los Angeles with producer Gary Katz. It was the final album to feature the full quintet lineup of Becker, Fagen, Denny Dias, Jim Hodder, and Jeff "Skunk" Baxter (who left to join The Doobie Brothers) and also featured significant contributions from many prominent Los Angeles-based studio musicians.  It was the last album to be made and released while Steely Dan was still an active touring band.

The album was a commercial and critical success. Its hit single "Rikki Don't Lose That Number" helped restore Steely Dan's radio presence after the disappointing performance of their 1973 album Countdown to Ecstasy. Pretzel Logic was reissued on CD in 1987 and remastered in 1999 to retrospective critical acclaim.

Recording and production 
Pretzel Logic was recorded at The Village Recorder in West Los Angeles. It was produced by Gary Katz and written primarily by Walter Becker and bandleader Donald Fagen, who also sang and played keyboard. The album marked the beginning of Becker and Fagen's roles as Steely Dan's principal members. They enlisted prominent Los Angeles-based studio musicians to record Pretzel Logic, but used them only for occasional overdubs, except for drums, where founding drummer Jim Hodder was reduced to a backing singer, replaced by Jim Gordon and Jeff Porcaro on the drum kit for all of the songs on the album. Steely Dan's Jeff "Skunk" Baxter played pedal steel guitar and hand drums.

The cover photo featuring a New York pretzel vendor was taken by Raeanne Rubenstein, a photographer of musicians and Hollywood celebrities. She shot the photo on the west side of Fifth Avenue and 79th Street, just above the 79th Street Transverse (the road through Central Park), at the park entrance called "Miners' Gate".

Music and lyrics 
Pretzel Logic has shorter songs and fewer instrumental jams than the group's 1973 album Countdown to Ecstasy. Steely Dan considered it the band's attempt at complete musical statements within the three-minute pop-song format. The album's music is characterized by harmonies, counter-melodies, and bop phrasing. It also relies often on straightforward pop influences. The syncopated piano line that opens "Rikki Don't Lose That Number" develops into a pop melody, and the title track transitions from a blues song to a jazzy chorus.

Steely Dan often incorporated jazz into their music during the 1970s. "Rikki Don't Lose That Number" appropriates the bass pattern from Horace Silver's 1965 song "Song for My Father", while "Parker's Band" features Charlie Parker–influenced riffs and a lyric that invites listeners to "take a piece of Mr. Parker's band." Baxter's guitar playing drew on jazz and rock and roll influences. On Duke Ellington's "East St. Louis Toodle-oo", he imitates a muted horn solo. Certain songs incorporate additional instrumentation, including exotic percussion, violin sections, bells, and horns. Music critic Robert Christgau wrote that the solos are "functional rather than personal or expressive, locked into the workings of the music".

"Charlie Freak" recounts the tale of a vagrant drug-addict who sells his only possession, a gold ring, to the narrator, to buy the final fix that kills him.

Marketing and sales 
Pretzel Logic was released by ABC Records on February 20, 1974, to high sales. It charted at number eight on the Billboard 200 and became Steely Dan's third gold-certified album. After the disappointing performance of Countdown to Ecstasy, the album restored their radio presence with the single "Rikki Don't Lose That Number", which became the biggest pop hit of their career and peaked at number four on the Billboard Hot 100. On September 7, 1993, Pretzel Logic was certified platinum by the Recording Industry Association of America (RIAA), having shipped one million copies in the United States.

Critical reception 

Pretzel Logic was praised by contemporary critics. Bud Scoppa from Rolling Stone magazine found the album's "wonderfully fluid ensemble sound" unprecedented in popular music and said that the ambiguous lyrics "create an emotionally charged atmosphere, and the best are quite affecting." Down Beat asserted that "there are no better rock recording groups in America, and damn few worldwide." Christgau found the record innovative, writing in Creem: "The music can be called jazzy without implying an insult, and Donald Fagen and Walter Becker are the real world's answer to Robert Hunter and Jerry Garcia." In a mixed review, Noel Coppage of Stereo Review was impressed by the music, but said that "the lyrics baffle me; maybe they know what they're talking about, but I can't get a clue."

At the end of 1974, Pretzel Logic was named NME magazine's album of the year, and it was also voted the second best record of 1974 in the Pazz & Jop, an annual poll of prominent critics published by The Village Voice. Christgau, the poll's creator, ranked it number one in his own list. He later wrote that the album encapsulated Steely Dan's "chewy perversity as aptly as its title", with vocals by Fagen that "seem like the golden mean of pop ensemble singing, stripped of histrionics and displays of technique, almost ... sincere, modest."

In The All-Music Guide to Rock (1995), Rick Clark gave it five stars and said that, with the album, Steely Dan "most successfully synthesized their love for jazz into their dense pop/rock sound." Allmusic's Stephen Thomas Erlewine called it their "richest album" and wrote that Becker and Fagen's songwriting had become "seamless while remaining idiosyncratic and thrillingly accessible." Stylus Magazines Patrick McKay said that the "superb" album found them "relying instead on crack studio musicians that could realize their increasingly complex compositions". Rob Sheffield, writing in The Rolling Stone Album Guide (2004), said "Steely Dan's songwriting and Fagen's singing were at their peak of fluid power: The whole album is flawless".

Pretzel Logic has appeared on many professional listings of the greatest albums. In 1994, it was ranked number 67 in the All Time Top 1000 Albums by writer Colin Larkin, who felt the album's mix of jazz, R&B, and pop styles was "highly inventive" and "greater than the sum of its parts" (in the following edition of the ranking in year 2000, it fell to number 292). In 2003, Rolling Stone ranked Pretzel Logic at number 385 on its list of the 500 greatest albums of all time, and 386 in 2012. Based on such rankings, the aggregate website Acclaimed Music lists Pretzel Logic as the 403th-most acclaimed album in history, as well as the 114th-most from the 1970s and the seventh-most from 1974. The album was also included in the book 1001 Albums You Must Hear Before You Die.

 Track listing 
All songs written by Walter Becker and Donald Fagen, except where noted.

 Personnel 

 Steely Dan 
 Donald Fagen – keyboards, saxophone, lead vocals, background vocals
 Walter Becker – bass, guitar, background vocals
 Jeff Baxter – lead guitar (wah-wah on "East St. Louis Toodle-Oo"), pedal steel guitar
 Denny Dias – guitar
 Jim Hodder – backing vocals on "Parker's Band"

 Additional musicians 

 Michael Omartian – piano, keyboards
 David Paich – piano, keyboards
 Ben Benay – guitar
 Dean Parks – guitar, banjo
 Plas Johnson – saxophone
 Jerome Richardson – saxophone
 Ernie Watts – saxophone
 Ollie Mitchell – trumpet
 Lew McCreary – trombone
 Timothy B. Schmit – background vocals on "Rikki Don't Lose That Number", "Barrytown" and "Pretzel Logic"
 Wilton Felder – bass
 Chuck Rainey – bass
 Jim Gordon – drums on all tracks except "Night by Night"
 Jeff Porcaro – drums on "Night by Night", additional drums on "Parker's Band"
 Victor Feldman – percussion
 Roger Nichols – gong on "East St. Louis Toodle-Oo"

 Production 

 Producer: Gary Katz
 Engineer: Roger Nichols
 Reissue Consultant: Daniel Levitin
 Orchestration: Jimmie Haskell
 Design: David Larkham
 Art direction: Ed Caraeff
 Photography: Ed Caraeff
 Cover photo: Raeanne Rubenstein

 Charts Singles'

References

Bibliography

External links 
 
 

Steely Dan albums
ABC Records albums
Probe Records albums
Albums produced by Gary Katz
1974 albums